Sin3 histone deacetylase corepressor complex component SDS3 is an enzyme that in humans is encoded by the SUDS3 gene.

Function 

SDS3 is a subunit of the histone deacetylase (see HDAC1; MIM 601241)-dependent SIN3A (MIM 607776) corepressor complex (Fleischer et al., 2003).[supplied by OMIM]

Interactions 

SUDS3 has been shown to interact with HDAC1, Host cell factor C1, SIN3B and SIN3A.

References

Further reading